Bob Ostertag Plays the Serge 1978-1983 is the twelfth studio album by Bob Ostertag, released on June 30, 2014 by Analogue Motions Studio and Kandala Records.

Reception
Chicago Reader gave Plays the Serge 1978-1983 a positive review and said "Ostertag plays solo or collaborates with fellow improvisers (saxophonist Ned Rothenberg, violinist Jim Katzin, guitarist Fred Frith), and his intuitive performances on the unwieldy instrument still sound dangerous today—I can't imagine how it would've felt to stumble on this in the late 70s."

Track listing

Personnel
Adapted from the Bob Ostertag Plays the Serge 1978-1983 liner notes.

Musicians
 Fred Frith – guitar (2), six-string bass guitar (2)
 Jim Katzin – violin (1, 4, 5)
 Bob Ostertag – Serge synthesizer, liner notes, radio (1, 2, 3), percussion (3)
 Richard Rogers – piano (5)
 Ned Rothenberg – alto saxophone (1, 4), piano (5)

Production and design
 Bruce Levinson – recording (1, 2)

Release history

References

External links 
 Bob Ostertag Plays the Serge 1978-1983 at Discogs (list of releases)

2014 albums
Bob Ostertag albums